Boutwell may refer to:

Boutwell Creek, a stream in Minnesota
USCGC Boutwell, two cutters operated by the United States Coast Guard
USRC Boutwell (1873), a Revenue Cutter of the United States Revenue Cutter Service
George S. Boutwell, American statesman
John W. Boutwell, recipient of the Medal of Honor for valor 
Lo Boutwell, American football player
Tommy Boutwell, American football player